Temnocidaris is an extinct genus of echinoids that lived from the Late Cretaceous to the Paleocene. Its remains have been found in Europe and North America.

Sources

 Fossils (Smithsonian Handbooks) by David Ward (Page 177)

External links
Temnocidaris in the Paleobiology Database

Prehistoric echinoid genera
Cidaroida genera
Cretaceous echinoderms
Paleocene echinoderms
Prehistoric echinoderms of Europe
Prehistoric echinoderms of North America
Late Cretaceous genus first appearances
Paleocene genus extinctions